The Remote Sensing and Geospatial Information System training centre is located in University of Pune, India's premier institute for graduate and post graduate courses. The courses offered for GIS and RS here are held under the Department of Geography.

History
GIS and RS training at the University of Pune started in June 2001 as a one-year diploma course for students from interdisciplinary backgrounds. Dr. (Ms.) Vrishali Deosthali started the course, aiming to create  professionals armed with sound knowledge and practical experience, to serve in the remote sensing and GIS industry. In view of its immense popularity, a two-year post graduate program for geoinformatics was started in June 2006. The course coordinator is geography head of department, Dr. V.S. Kale.

Infrastructure
Since the beginning of the course, due to lack of infrastructure, classes have been held in seminar halls belonging to various departments of the university. Further, practical training of GIS and RS technologies were conducted in labs that could not hold the growing number of students each year. In July 2008 the University of Pune had sanctioned funds for the construction of independent space for geoinformatics laboratories and classrooms. Now the department has new building constructed in 2014. All the classes are held in the new classrooms.

Technologies
The various topics that are covered in its diploma and degree courses are listed below
 Geographic Information Systems
 Remote Sensing
 Global Positioning Systems
 Spatial Decision Support Systems
 Digital Photogrammetry
 Geostatistics
 Programming
 Data Mining

External links
 University of Pune
 Department of Geography

Savitribai Phule Pune University
Schools of informatics